Elek is a town in Békés County, in the Southern Great Plain region of south-east Hungary.
Jews lived in the city as early as the 19th century and in 1944 many of them were murdered by the Nazis in the Holocaust.

Geography

History
 1232 : First mentioned
 1566-1696 : Ottoman rule (Ottoman wars in Europe)
 1724 : settling of German colonists (predominantly from Franconia)
 1739 : Bubonic plague
 1894 : Artesian aquifer
 1920 : Elek becomes border town (Treaty of Trianon)
 1946 : Expulsion of German inhabitants, about half the population
 1996 : Elek given town status

Twin towns
Elek is twinned with:
 Gerolzhofen, Germany (1990)
 Alerheim, Germany (1992)
 Leimen, Germany (1992)
 Sebiș (Borossebes), Romania (1992)
 Gerlingen, Germany
 Laudenbach, Germany (1994)
 Veľké Kapušany (Nagykapocs), Slovakia (1996)
 Grăniceri (Ottlaka), Romania (1997)	
 Dumbrava (Igazfalva), Romania (2019)

References

External links

  in Hungarian

Populated places in Békés County
Romanian communities in Hungary
Jewish communities destroyed in the Holocaust

tr:Elek